Cymatoderella is a genus of checkered beetles in the family Cleridae. There are at least three described species in Cymatoderella.

Species
These three species belong to the genus Cymatoderella:
 Cymatoderella collaris (Spinola, 1844)
 Cymatoderella morula Rifkind, 1993
 Cymatoderella patagoniae (Knull, 1946)

References

Further reading

External links

 

Tillinae
Articles created by Qbugbot